The Dallas Quest is a graphic adventure game based on the soap opera Dallas. The game was programmed by James Garon for the TRS-80  Color Computer and published by Tandy Corporation in 1984. It was the second game in the "Animated Adventure" series, following The Sands of Egypt, and uses the same split-screen display.  Datasoft published versions for the Apple II, Atari 8-bit family, and Commodore 64 in the same year.

The player takes the role of a detective. After an initial sequence at Southfork Ranch, the setting moves to South America, and the game has little to do with the TV show.

Development
Lorimar Productions, the studio that produced Dallas, licensed the rights to its characters to Datasoft and provided a script by two "screenwriter's assistants" for the show. James Garon adapted the script into a text adventure game, with graphics provided by professional artists.

Reception 
A five star Your Commodore review praised the graphics as some of the best in the genre, though they "take a long time to be reproduced." The reviewer disliked the sparse use of music and was not impressed with the music that does exist. Overall, it was called "one of the best games out on the CBM 64."

Arnie Katz concluded a 1984 Electronic Games review with, "Once you get past the fact that Dallas Quest isn't very closely tied to the show, it turns out to be somewhat entertaining and reasonably challenging."

References

External links
The Dallas Quest at Atari Mania

The Dallas Quest at the official site for the TV series

1984 video games
Apple II games
Atari 8-bit family games
Commodore 64 games
Dallas (TV franchise)
Datasoft games
TRS-80 Color Computer games
Video games based on television series
Video games developed in the United States
Video games set in Texas
Video games set in the 1980s
Single-player video games